Jolly Rwanyonga Mazimhaka is a Rwandan academic and education specialist. She was married to Patrick Mazimhaka (1948–2018); they have three daughters.

Background and education 

Jolly Mazimhaka was born in Uganda and attended the Trinity College Nabbingo. She has a Bachelor of Arts Honours degree in English Literature and a postgraduate diploma in Education from Kampala's Makerere University and a master's degree in Commonwealth Literature as well as a PhD in Renaissance Drama, with a focus on gender, class and race issues from the University of Saskatchewan.

Career 

She started her career teaching Literature and English at the Mount Saint Mary's College Namagunga in Uganda and at the Loreto Convent Girls School in Limuru, Kenya. She later was a lecturer in English at the University of Saskatchewan.

At the Kigali Institute of Science and Technology (KIST) Jolly Mazimhaka occupied several positions, including:

 Lecturer in English
 Lecturer in Research Methodology
 Director: Academic Quality Assurance
 Acting Vice-Rector: Academic

At the National University of Rwanda (UNR) she was:

 Director: Academic Quality Assurance
 Director: University Teaching and Learning Enhancement

She is a member of the board of advisors of the Akilah Institute, a non-profit college for women in Kigali, and board member of Equality Power, an initiative that supports ethical and diverse projects in Sub-Saharan Africa. She was president of the Rotary Club Kigali-Virunga.

Publications 

 Jolly Mazimhaka: Coming Home. Oxford University Press 2004, .
 Jolly Mazimhaka: Mutesi in Trouble. Oxford University Press 2004, .
 Rebecca Schendel, Jolly Mazimhaka, Chika Ezeanya: Higher Education for Development in Rwanda. 2013, International Higher Education 70, p. 19ff

External links 
 CV of Jolly Mazimhaka on the website of Equality Power

References 

Living people
Academic staff of the College of Science and Technology (Rwanda)
Makerere University alumni
University of Saskatchewan alumni
People educated at Trinity College Nabbingo
20th-century births
Year of birth missing (living people)
Academic staff of the National University of Rwanda